Lamia Makaddam (born 1971 in Sousse) is a Tunisian poet, journalist and translator.

Biography 
Lamia Makaddam was born in 1971 in Sousse, Tunisia. She began writing poetry at an early age and, despite having no female mentors in poetry, was encouraged by her family and teachers in her writing. She published her first poem in the leftist newspaper Badil.

She has written two books of poetry, and her work has been translated into English, French, Dutch, and Kurdish. She was awarded the al-Hijara Literary Prize in the Netherlands in 2000.

She has an MA in Arabic language and literature and, in addition to writing, works as a translator. She has lived in the Netherlands for 20 years and currently lives in Amsterdam.

Awards 
 al-Hijara Literary Prize, the Netherlands, 2000

Selected works

Books of poetry 
 Intahā hāḏahi al-qaṣīda .. intahā hāḏā al-ḥubb (This poem is done, this love is done), 2015
 Biṭaʻm al-fākiha al-šatwiyya (With the taste of winter fruit), 2007

Translations 
 Anta qulta (You said it), translation of the Dutch novel Jij zegt het, by Connie Palmen

Poems translated into English 
 Two poems ("Poetry was created to solve family problems", "Love makes woman a man and man a woman"), World Literature Today, 2018
 Four poems ("The bread seller", "If I ever wrote poetry", "A short skirt", "Something must break in the end"), Banipal, 2017
 Three poems, Banipal

References 

1971 births
Living people
Tunisian women poets
21st-century Tunisian writers
21st-century Tunisian women writers
20th-century Tunisian poets
21st-century Tunisian poets